Sir Christopher John Howard Chancellor (29 March 1904 – 9 September 1989) was a British journalist and administrator who was general manager of the news agency Reuters from 1944 to 1959. The Daily Telegraph credited him for keeping the company running under extremely difficult wartime circumstances, noting that "It was largely thanks to Chancellor that Reuters had survived the war intact, despite the loss for several years of the greatest part of its world market." By 1951, at the firm's 100th anniversary, Chancellor was credited with tripling the agency's correspondents and revenues.

Biography
Chancellor was son of Lt. Col. Sir John Robert Chancellor  (1870–1952), a colonial administrator. He was educated at Eton College and Trinity College, Cambridge. Chancellor joined Reuters in 1930 and remained with the agency for 29 years.

Based in Shanghai from 1931 to 1939 with his young family, he kept the agency's China service operating after the Japanese invasion in 1932. He returned to London during World War II, and worked with William Moloney and William Haley in reorganising Reuters' news and business operations, succeeding Sir Roderic Jones as the general manager of Reuters in 1944.

Chancellor was knighted in the 1951 King's Birthday Honours List.  He died at Wincanton, in southwest England, at age 85.

Family
In 1926, Chancellor married Sylvia Mary Paget (1901–1996), daughter of Sir Richard Paget. She was made OBE in 1976 for her philanthropic activities. Among their children were John Paget Chancellor (1927–2014), editor of the encyclopædia Knowledge, and Alexander Chancellor, editor of The Spectator. Their grandchildren include actresses Anna Chancellor and Dolly Wells, model Cecilia Chancellor, and financial historian Edward Chancellor.

Notes

References

Further reading
Sir Christopher John Robert Chancellor (1904–1989) Oxford DNB entry
New York Times obituary, 1989
  Christopher Chancellor's work at Reuters as viewed by Time magazine, "100 for Reuters", 23 July 1951.

British reporters and correspondents
English male journalists
1904 births
1989 deaths
People educated at Eton College
Alumni of Trinity College, Cambridge
Knights Bachelor